Judgement Day is an annual Welsh Rugby Union event that takes place at Millennium Stadium (currently known for sponsorship reasons as Principality Stadium) in Cardiff and is part of the Pro14 competition. The four regions – Cardiff Blues, Dragons, Ospreys and Scarlets – join with the Welsh Rugby Union in organising a double-header fixture at the Millennium Stadium. The annual derby day clash will be repeated for the foreseeable future with the two east Wales regions taking on the two west Wales regions. In 2020, the two matches were held on consecutive days at Rodney Parade due to the COVID-19 pandemic causing a change to the format of the 2019–20 season and the Millennium Stadium being unavailable due to it being used as the Dragon's Heart Hospital.

Judgement Day I (2013)

2013 was the inaugural year of Judgement Day, which saw Newport Gwent Dragons play Scarlets and Cardiff Blues play Ospreys.

Newport Gwent Dragons vs Scarlets

Cardiff Blues vs Ospreys

Judgement Day II (2014)

2014 saw the return of the double derby at the Millennium Stadium as Cardiff Blues faced Scarlets and Newport Gwent Dragons faced Ospreys.

Cardiff Blues vs Scarlets

Newport Gwent Dragons vs Ospreys

Judgement Day III (2015)

2015 saw the first double derby at the Millennium Stadium under the new Six Year Rugby Services Agreement. Cardiff Blues faced the Ospreys and Newport Gwent Dragons faced the Scarlets. The 52,762 crowd for the 2 matches, was a Judgment Day and Pro 12 match record.

Cardiff Blues vs Ospreys

Newport Gwent Dragons vs Scarlets

Judgement Day IV (2016)

Cardiff Blues vs Ospreys

Newport Gwent Dragons vs Scarlets

Judgement Day V (2017)

Cardiff Blues vs Ospreys

Newport Gwent Dragons vs Scarlets

Judgement Day VI (2018)

Following the 2016–17 season, the Newport Gwent Dragons dropped their geographic identifiers from their name, becoming simply Dragons.

Dragons vs Scarlets

Cardiff Blues vs Ospreys

Judgement Day VII (2019)

Dragons vs Scarlets

Cardiff Blues vs Ospreys

Judgement Day VIII (2020)

Dragons vs Scarlets

Cardiff Blues vs Ospreys

Judgement Day 2023

Dragons vs Scarlets

Ospreys vs Cardiff Blues

See also

 United Rugby Championship
 Welsh Rugby Union
 Wales national rugby union team
 1872 Cup - Scottish derby

References

Notes

Judgement Day
Cardiff Rugby
Dragons RFC
Ospreys (rugby union)
Scarlets
Annual events in Wales
Annual sporting events in the United Kingdom
Spring (season) events in Wales
Rugby union in Wales